Arnold Zable (born 1947) is an Australian writer, novelist, storyteller and human rights advocate.  His books include the memoir Jewels and Ashes, three novels: Café Scheherazade, Scraps of Heaven, and Sea of Many Returns, two collections of stories: The Fig Tree and Violin Lessons, and The Fighter. His most recent book, The Watermill, was published in March 2020.

Life
Zable was born on 10 January 1947 in Wellington, New Zealand to Polish-Jewish refugee parents. They moved early in his life to Australia and he grew up in Carlton, Victoria.

Themes and style
Zable is known as a storyteller — through his memoirs, short stories and novels. Australian critic Susan Varga says that Zable's award-winning memoir, Jewels and Ashes, "was a ground-breaking book in Australia, one of the first of what has since become a distinct auto/biographical genre: a second-generation writer returns to the scene of unspeakable crimes to try to understand a fraught and complex legacy, and, in so doing, embarks on a journey into the self."

In an interview Zable explained that the rights and experiences of refugees and asylum seekers underpins his work: 
The current generation of refugees are experiencing the intense challenges faced by previous generations. We tend to forget, or fail to imagine, how difficult it is to start life anew far from the homeland. We forget also that nostalgia, the longing for the return to homeland, is a deep and enduring aspect of the refugee experience.

In the same interview he said about his language that "I am drawn to the quirky sayings and observations that define a person or a culture".

Awards and nominations
1991: National Book Council Lysbeth Cohen Award for Jewels and Ashes
1991: Ethnic Affairs Commission Award for Jewels and Ashes
1992: FAW ANA Literature Award for Jewels and Ashes
1992: Braille Book of the Year Award for Jewels and Ashes
1992: Talking Book of the Year award for Jewels and Ashes
2001: Shortlisted New South Wales Premier's Literary Awards for fiction for Cafe Scheherazade
2003: People's Choice Award, Tasmanian Pacific Fiction Prize for Cafe Scheherazade
2004: National Folk Recording Award for The Fig Tree
2010: Nominated for The International IMPAC Dublin Literary Award for Sea of Many Returns
2013: The Victorian Council for Civil Liberties Voltaire Award
2015: Life membership, Writers Victoria
2016: Shortlisted, The Victorian Premier's Literary Awards for 'The Fighter'
2016: Shortlisted, The New South Wales Literary awards for 'The Fighter'
2017: The Australia Council Fellowship for Literature
2020: Shortlisted, Queensland Literary Awards, Nonfiction Book Award, for The Watermill
2021: Australia Council Award for Lifetime Achievement in Literature

Bibliography

Books

Critical studies and reviews of Zable's work
Violin lessons

External links
Arnold Zable's website

References

1947 births
Living people
Australian male novelists
Australian memoirists
Australian people of Polish-Jewish descent
Australian male short story writers
Jewish Australian writers
New Zealand emigrants to Australia
New Zealand Jews
New Zealand people of Polish-Jewish descent
Writers from Melbourne
Activists from Melbourne
20th-century Australian novelists
21st-century Australian novelists
20th-century Australian short story writers
21st-century Australian short story writers
20th-century Australian male writers
21st-century Australian male writers